Startsevo is a rural locality (a village) in Almozerskoye Rural Settlement, Vytegorsky District, Vologda Oblast, Russia. The population was 1 as of 2002.

Geography 
Startsevo is located 43 km southeast of Vytegra (the district's administrative centre) by road. Veliky Dvor is the nearest rural locality.

References 

Rural localities in Vytegorsky District